Lepturgantes seriatus is a species of beetle in the family Cerambycidae. It was described by Monné in 1988.

References

Acanthocinini
Beetles described in 1988